We're So Young (Portuguese: Somos tão Jovens) is a 2013 Brazilian biographical drama film about Brazilian rock singer Renato Russo. The film does not follow Russo's entire life, instead focusing on his adolescence, his physical problems and the discovery of his love for music. It is directed by Antônio Carlos da Fontoura, written by Marcos Bernstein and starring Thiago Mendonça and Laila Zaid. It was released in Brazilian theaters by distributors Imagem Filmes and Fox Film on May 3, 2013.

Plot
In 1973, the Manfredini family moved from Rio to Brasília. Renato, suffered from a rare bone disease, the epiphysiolysis and after surgery he was in need of a wheelchair. Forced to stay at home and being treated with morphine, the young man began to project his plans to become the greatest rock star of Brazil, creating, later, the group Aborto Elétrico, becoming the "Loner Troubadour" and later, forming and fronting the popular alternative rock band Legião Urbana.

Cast

 Thiago Mendonça as Renato Russo
 Laila Zaid as Ana Cláudia
 Sandra Corveloni as Carminha
 Marcos Breda as Dr. Renato
 Bianca Comparato as Carmem Teresa
 Bruno Torres as Fê Lemos
 Daniel Passi as Flávio Lemos
 Conrado Godoy as Marcelo Bonfá
 Nicolau Villa-Lobos as Dado Villa-Lobos
 Sérgio Dalcin as André Pretorius
 Ibsen Perucci as Dinho Ouro Preto
 Olívia Torres as Gabriela
 Kotoe Karasawa as Suzy
 Nathalia Lima Verde as Helena
 Henrique Pires as Carlos Alberto
 André de Carvalho as Tony
 Vitor Bonfá as Loro Jones
 Victor Carballar as Philippe Seabra
 Kael Studart as Andi
 Waldomiro Alves as Feijão
 Leonardo Villas Braga as Hermano Vianna
 Edu Moraes as Herbert Vianna
 Natasha Stransky as Teresa
 René Machado as Ico Ouro Preto
 Daniel Granieri as Zeca

Production
Initially, the idea was to make a documentary about the life of Renato Russo. In 1999, producer Luiz Fernando Borges presented the project to the Manfredini family and received permission to start it. In 2005, the idea of a documentary was changed, and a feature film was already being produced, now under the command of Antonio Fontoura. In mid-2009, part of the cast was confirmed, and filming began only in 2011 in Brasília. Later, Paulínia and the University of Campinas were filming locations.

References

External links

2013 biographical drama films
2013 films
20th Century Fox films
Biographical films about musicians
Brazilian biographical drama films
Films shot in Brasília
Films shot in Campinas
Films shot in Paulínia
Legião Urbana
Cultural depictions of Brazilian men
Cultural depictions of rock musicians
Brazilian rock music films
2013 drama films